The 2016–17 Greek A2 Basket League was the 31st season of the Greek A2 Basket League, the second-tier level professional club basketball league in Greece. It was the competition's second season with the participation of 16 teams. Playoff and play out games were held, for a second consecutive season. Panionios were crowned the league champions and were promoted to the 2017–18 Greek Basket League, along with playoff winners Faros Keratsiniou.

Teams

Standings

Postseason

Playoffs

Play Out
Arkadikos – Iraklio 2–0
Machites Doxas Pefkon – Kavala 2–1

Final league standings

See also
2016–17 Greek Basketball Cup
2016–17 Greek Basket League (1st tier)

References

External links
Greek A2 Basketball League
Hellenic Basketball Federation 

Greek A2 Basket League
Greek
2